The 2014 Girls' U16 South American Volleyball Championship was the 3rd edition of the tournament, organised by South America's governing volleyball body, the Confederación Sudamericana de Voleibol (CSV). Held in Chosica, Lima, Perú from November 6 to 9, 2014.

Teams

Competition System
All matches in the preliminary round and the semifinals are played best out of three sets, the third place match and the Gold Medal match are played best out of 5 as normal senior tournaments.

The competition system for the second Girls' U16 South American Championship consist of two rounds, the first round was a Round-Robin system. Each team plays once against each of the 7 remaining teams with each team playing two matches in a day against different teams.

According to the final ranking in the first round, the best four teams will play in the semifinals (1º VS 4º and 2º VS 3º), the winners will play for the Gold Medal while the losers will play for the Bronze Medal.

Matches
All times are Perú Standard Time (UTC-5)

Standings

|}

First round

Day 1

|}

Day 2

|}

Day 3

|}

Final round

Championship bracket

Semifinals

|}

Bronze Medal match

|}

Gold Medal match

|}

Final standing

Team Roster:
Marcia Herrera,	
Coraima Hidalgo (L),		
Claudia Palza,	
Luz Chocano,
Nayeli Vílchez,	
Alejandra Barrera,	
Flavia Montes,
Shanaiya Ayme,
Nicole Linares,	
Kiara Montes,	
Zandra Del Águila,	
Thaisa McLeod,
Head Coach: Enrique Briceño

Individual awards

Most Valuable Player
 
Best Middle Blockers
 
 
Best Opposite
 

Best Setter
 
Best Outside Hitters
 
 
Best Libero

References

Women's South American Volleyball Championships
S
Volleyball
Youth volleyball